Hyperion is a character appearing in American comic books published by Marvel Comics, of which there are several notable versions. Created by writer Roy Thomas and artist Sal Buscema, the original Hyperion made his debut in The Avengers #69 (October 1969). The alternate versions are each from a different dimension of the Marvel Multiverse, and consist of both heroes and villains. Thomas says that the character was intended as a pastiche of DC's iconic hero Superman.

The first Hyperion, Zhib-Ran, was a member of Squadron Sinister, a team created by the Grandmaster to fight against a team of Avengers gathered by the time travelling Kang. Two years after the character's first appearance, a heroic version appeared as a founding member of the alternate-reality Squadron Supreme. This incarnation of the character was a major character in the 1985 series Squadron Supreme, which fleshed out the characterization of Hyperion and the other Squadron Supreme members. In 2003 Marvel Comics launched Supreme Power, a new take on the Squadron Supreme universe, where Hyperion is raised by the United States government to be a super-powered operative. Yet another alternate Hyperion joined the Avengers and later the Earth-616 version of the Squadron Supreme.

Publication history 
The first iteration of Hyperion, created by Roy Thomas and Sal Buscema, debuted in The Avengers #69 as a member of the Squadron Sinister. The team was loosely based on heroes from DC Comics' Justice League of America, with Hyperion based on Superman.

Two years later, Thomas and penciller John Buscema created an alternate, heroic version of the Squadron Sinister called the Squadron Supreme, once again in the title The Avengers, using characters with the same names as those of the Squadron Sinister (this caused confusion in Marvel's production department, as the covers of The Avengers #85 and #141 claimed the issues featured appearances by the Squadron Sinister when it was in fact the Squadron Supreme that appeared in both issues). In the 12-issue Squadron Supreme limited series (Sept. 1985-Aug. 1986) Mark Gruenwald picked up from where Earth-712 was last seen in The Defenders #114 and revealed this Hyperion's origins.

The character is re-imagined for Marvel's MAX imprint title Supreme Power, where he is an alien who has been raised by the government. This iteration received a spinoff miniseries, Supreme Power: Hyperion, which showed a dystopian possible future.

Another Hyperion joins the Avengers in Jonathan Hickman's The Avengers vol. 5 #1 (Dec. 2012). Hickman described the decision to use a new Hyperion, rather than an existing one:

This is yet another parallel universe Hyperion. This is not King Hyperion, or Supreme Power Hyperion, this is not Gruenwald's Hyperion. This is Hyperion without all that baggage. This is Hyperion with a fresh slate, for a very specific purpose. He comes out of what the big story is behind the whole Avengers three-year plan that I have. He's very important, very pivotal, and I think people are really going to dig where we go with that. He's not going to be our poor analogue for Superman.

A pastiche of Hyperion, "Hyperius", appears in DC Comics' Final Crisis and The Multiversity, part of a group of recursive homages to other companies' pastiches of DC characters.

Fictional character biography

Squadron Sinister
The Squadron Sinister  are assembled by the cosmic entity the Grandmaster to battle the champions of the time-traveling Kang the Conqueror, the superhero team the Avengers. Hyperion (Zhib-Ran) is apparently brought from a microverse. The Avengers defeat the Squadron and thwart the Grandmaster, with Thor shrinking Hyperion and trapping him in a glass sphere. The Squadron reappears in the title Defenders, reunited by the alien Nebulon. The villains receive greater power in exchange for the planet Earth, and create a giant laser cannon in the Arctic to melt the polar ice caps, which would cover the entire planet in water. The superhero team the Defenders prevent the scheme and defeat the villains (and Nebulon), with the Hulk overpowering Hyperion. After this defeat Hyperion and his two remaining teammates are teleported off world by Nebulon, and later return to Earth. Acquiring an energy-draining weapon, the villains plan to threaten the Earth once again but are defeated by the Defenders and the Avenger Yellowjacket.

The character battles Thor once again and encounters the Earth-712 version of Hyperion. He becomes involved with Thundra, but the relationship ends when she discovers a means of returning to her own dimension. The Earth-712 Master Menace transports Hyperion to his universe and informs him that he is an inorganic duplicate created by the Grandmaster modeled on the Earth-712 Hyperion. The Squadron Sinister Hyperion then impersonates the Squadron Supreme Hyperion for several weeks before dying in battle against the original. The Grandmaster briefly resurrects the character as part of a group called the Legion of the Unliving to combat the Avengers.

A new Hyperion is made when the Grandmaster reforms the Squadron Sinister. He is joined by a new Doctor Spectrum (Alice Nugent, former lab assistant of Henry Pym); the Whizzer (now called Speed Demon), and Nighthawk. This Hyperion originated from the Microverse, as the original Hyperion had believed himself to have been. The Grandmaster increases the Squadron Sinister's powers and they battle the New Thunderbolts. Thunderbolts team leader Baron Zemo defeats the Grandmaster, and in the ensuing chaos Hyperion and his teammates scatter and escape.

Squadron Supreme (Earth-712)
Hyperion, also known as Mark Milton, is a founding member of his reality's Squadron Supreme and the last known Eternal left on his Earth. Four Avengers from the Earth-616 universe accidentally arrive in this Squadron's reality, and the two groups first battle and then work together to stop the global threat posed by the mutant Brain-Child.

Hyperion and the Squadron Supreme are manipulated by the Serpent Crown into battling the Avengers. The Defenders travel to their world to fight the villain Overmind and his ally Null, the Living Darkness, who have placed the Squadron under their control.

Following the societal instability caused by Overmind's takeover of the planet, Hyperion and other Squadron members resolve, against their teammate Nighthawk's advice, to assume control of their United States government, instituting programs aimed at increasing quality of life; for instance Hyperion helps establish a behavior modification program, which the team uses to brainwash the Institute of Evil and numerous other criminals. He becomes trapped in an inter-dimensional zone and is impersonated by the Squadron Sinister Hyperion (Zhib-Ran). Forced to ally himself with Master Menace to escape, Hyperion battles Zhib-Ran to the death; although he wins, he is blinded in the fight. After a battle to the death with Nighthawk and the Redeemers, a team formed to stop the domineering Squadron, Hyperion relents and relinquishes power.

Hyperion and the other surviving members of the Squadron Supreme travel into space to protect their planet from the expanding Nth Man, and are exiled to the Earth-616 universe. The team encounters the hero Quasar, and take up residence at the government facility Project Pegasus. Quasar and the Eternal Makkari rescue the Squadron when the team is captured by the cosmic entity the Stranger; Makkari realizes that Hyperion is an Eternal and teaches him how to restore his eyesight. The entire Squadron later assists the Avengers against the villain Imus Champion before finding the means to return to their universe. Once home, the team disbands, but Hyperion reunites them when he discovers a corrupt government has filled the power vacuum they left. With the aid of inter-dimensional adventurers the Exiles, Hyperion and the Squadron expose the government to a global audience.

Earth-712 was eventually destroyed by an Incursion, a collision between two realities. Hyperion and Power Princess were the last two survivors of their team. A fatally injured Hyperion urged Zarda to escape their reality before it was destroyed.

Supreme Power

This Hyperion was sent to Earth in a spacecraft, and seized shortly after by U.S. government agents who raised him in a tightly controlled, isolated environment. As an adult, he became a covert agent used in strict secrecy, but eventually a reporter came too close to the truth, and the decision was made to make his existence public, largely so he could be used as a distraction from the government's even more closely guarded secret super-operative, Joe Ledger. He briefly allies himself with Nighthawk and Blur to find and defeat the super-powered serial killer Michael Redstone. As Hyperion discovers that he has been systematically lied to his entire life,<ref>Supreme Power #2-9. Marvel Comics.</ref> he becomes disillusioned with the government and eventually openly rebels. When the government attempts to blackmail him into returning by revealing his alien status to the public, he responds by smashing into the North Pole from space, creating a 10.5 seismic event.Supreme Power: Hyperion #1. Marvel Comics.

In the Supreme Power: Hyperion miniseries, a hastily assembled team of superhumans is sent by the government to retrieve him, and the resulting battle—through an interaction of Hyperion's "flash vision" eye-beams, Nuke's radiation blast, and Arcanna's reality manipulation—sends the combatants into what appears to be an alternate timeline where Hyperion and the Squadron Supreme rule a dystopian world. This causes Hyperion (on his counterpart's advice) to rethink his ideas about power, humanity, and teamwork, leading him to surrender to the Squadron from his world. Emil Burbank later deduces that it was not an alternate world they traveled to, but their own future; Burbank tells no one of his discovery.

Along with the rest of his team, save Nighthawk, Hyperion was killed by the Cabal during an Incursion.

Squadron Supreme (Earth-616)
This Hyperion was sent to his reality's Earth as a baby, the only survivor of a race of Eternals from a dying world. He was raised by a man named "Father", who named him Marcus Milton and taught him the morals of society. As an adult, he became the superhero named Hyperion and protected the world alongside the Squadron Supreme. When his reality collided with another, Hyperion was the only survivor, floating around in the void that had been his universe until a group of A.I.M. scientists pulled him into the Earth-616 reality. Hyperion was in the captivity of A.I.M. until he was freed by the Avengers and offered a place amongst them. Hyperion is among the superheroes that joined the Avengers due to the threat of Ex Nihilo on Mars. Hyperion was with the Avengers when A.I.M. was sighted in the Savage Land trying to extract the formula from one of the Garden's evolution pods. Hyperion later joins the Earth-616 version of the Squadron Supreme along with other various heroes who survived their home realities' destruction. This new incarnation of the Squadron Supreme are more dangerous than the Earth-712 and Supreme Power versions as they swear to protect Earth by any means necessary. Their first public battle is the destruction of Atlantis, which Hyperion enacts himself as well as severing Namor's head with his atomic vision, killing him instantly in retaliation for the King of Atlantis' role in the annihilation of Doctor Spectrum's home reality. After the public death of Namor the Squadron Supreme become a very controversial team which puts them at odds with the Avengers. Hyperion is convinced to take on a secret identity and later decides to take a job as a truck driver.

Squadron Supreme of America
A variation of the Mark Milton version of Hyperion appears as a member of the Squadron Supreme of America. This version is a simulacrum created by Mephisto and programmed by the Power Elite. Hyperion was programmed to be a mild-mannered man raised by farmers who had the strength of an Eternal. In his personal time, he works as a history teacher at Buscema High School in Kensington, Maryland.

In the team's first mission, Hyperion and the Squadron Supreme of America fought Namor and the Defenders of the Deep, when they targeted a Roxxon oil platform off the coast of Alaska. Hyperion had Orka tied up in chains.

Then, the Squadron Supreme visited another oil platform in the Gulf of Mexico. The Squadron Supreme then made short work of Namor and the Defenders of the Deep.

During the War of the Realms storyline, Mark was teaching a class when a code red was issued. He and other members of the Squadron Supreme of America were summoned to Washington D.C., where Phil Coulson brought them up to speed with Malekith the Accursed's invasion. Hyperion and the Squadron Supreme of America fight an army of Rock Trolls and Frost Giants. After the Squadron Supreme caused the Frost Giants to retreat, Phil Coulson sends them to Ohio which has become a battleground.

Hyperion was with the Squadron Supreme attempting to apprehend Black Panther, when he infiltrated the Pentagon to confront Phil Coulson. Hyperion states that the Squadron Supreme are the United States' sanctioned superhero team in light of the Avengers becoming an "anti-American" team.

Powers and abilities
Hyperion is a member of the race of superhumans known as the Eternals. As a result, he has superhuman strength, speed, stamina, durability, agility, reflexes, flight. All versions of Hyperion possess these superhuman attributes, and in a few cases powerful breath. Each also has greatly enhanced sensory perceptions which extends to being able to perceive the entire electromagnetic spectrum (IR, UV vision; radio hearing and radar). Their "atomic vision" allows them to fire beams off heat from their eyes.

The heroic Earth-712 version of Hyperion also possesses the ability to use cosmic energy to augment his life force granting him great longevity and regenerative abilities. Most of the powers and vitality of Hyperion and his alternative versions are diminished when exposed to "argonite radiation."

Reception

 Accolades 
 In 2015, Entertainment Weekly ranked Hyperion 72nd in their "Let's rank every Avenger ever" list.
 In 2017, CBR.com ranked Hyperion 5th in their "15 Most Overpowered Avengers" list.
 In 2018, CBR.com ranked Hyperion 7th in their "25 Most Powerful Avengers Ever" list and 14th in their "Marvel's 20 Strongest Villains" list.
 In 2019, CBR.com ranked Hyperion 7th in their "10 Best New Avengers Of The Decade" list.
 In 2021, CBR.com ranked Hyperion 5th in their "Marvel: The 10 Strongest Male Avengers" list and 5th in their "Marvel: 10 Fastest Villains In The Comics" list.
 In 2021, Screen Rant included Hyperion in their "10 Most Powerful Members Of The Squadron Supreme" list and in their "16 Most Powerful Cosmic Characters In Marvel Comics" list.
 In 2022, CBR.com ranked Hyperion 4th in their "10 Scariest Avengers" list and 7th in their "Strongest Fighters In The Avengers" list.

Other versions
Exiles
King Hyperion was a member of the reality-hopping team known as Weapon X. He is incredibly ruthless and seeks to conquer alternate Earths, but is eventually defeated by Blink and an alternate version of Gambit. Although his body is blown to pieces, Hyperion survives, regenerating and eventually regaining his full power. He seeks revenge on the Exiles, only to be engaged in battle by two alternate versions of himself, including the Earth-712 version. King Hyperion is then exiled to his home reality, where Earth was completely destroyed by nuclear weapons in an attempt to destroy him years prior. He somehow escapes, and is later seen in the mainstream Earth-616 reality's Russia, battling the Winter Guard and the Blue Marvel. He is imprisoned in the Raft, and Luke Cage nominates him for the Thunderbolts program. King Hyperion tells the team that he is a heroic iteration, and that the Hyperion who fought Blue Marvel had switched places with him upon defeat. This is a lie, and he turns on the Thunderbolts during their first mission together. He is soon brought down by Ghost, who uses the nanites in King Hyperion's spine to dose him with argonite. After that, Hyperion is subject to Man-Thing's touch, which burns anyone who feels fear.

Marvel Zombies Supreme
Scientists in the mainstream 616 reality graft the DNA of the Earth-712 Squadron Supreme members to normal human corpses and zap them with radiation to create a Squadron Supreme for their reality in an attempt to attain disease-curing knowledge of genetics. The bodies are reanimated as zombies, and, believing themselves to be the original Squadron Supreme, they attempt to escape the lab facility. Hyperion is successful and goes on an eating rampage in Kansas, but eventually finds enough willpower to realize deep in his mind the immorality of his appetite-driven actions, and thus in turn stopping himself through eating cattle infected with mad cow disease to kill himself.

Paradise X
In the Paradise X miniseries, a version of Hyperion is recruited by X-51 for his squadron of interdimensional heralds. in his reality, almost all superheroes perished in a nuclear attack by Earth's governments. He later kills Kulan Gath, who is responsible for the deaths of many of another reality's heroes.

Secret Wars 2015
Another version of Hyperion appears on Battleworld during Secret Wars in the four issue mini-series Squadron Sinister. He and his Squadron have been annexing other domains of Battleworld. Nighthawk secretly works against Hyperion, framing the Whizzer for treachery so that Hyperion incinerates him, and causing Doctor Spectrum to flee when he is also framed. Nighthawk later shoots Hyperion with an argonite gun, and holds his own in a fight with him using Doctor Spectrum's power prism until Hyperion is so weakened by the argonite that Nighthawk simply strangles him to death with his bare hands.

In other media
Television
 Hyperion appears in The Super Hero Squad Show episode "Whom Continuity Would Destroy!", voiced by Travis Willingham. He, Nighthawk, and Power Princess are pulled from their reality by the Grandmaster to fight Iron Man, the Hulk, and the Scarlet Witch.
 Hyperion appears in Avengers Assemble, voiced by Brian Bloom. This version is an alien from another planet alongside the Squadron Supreme, who thought the only way to bring peace was to rule over their people like tyrants and destroyed their own planet when the population refused to blindly obey them. Hyperion first appears in a self-titled season one episode and became a member of the Red Skull's Cabal until the latter betrayed them. In season two, Hyperion reunites with the Squadron Supreme and attempt to subject the Earth to their tyranny, only to be defeated by the Avengers and remanded to the Vault.

Video games
 Hyperion appears as an unlockable character in the Facebook game Marvel: Avengers Alliance.
 Hyperion appears as an unlockable character in the IOS/Android game Marvel: Future Fight.
 Hyperion appears as a playable character available via DLC in Lego Marvel's Avengers.
 Hyperion appears as a playable character in the IOS/Android game Marvel: Contest of Champions''.

References

External links
 Hyperion at Marvel.com
 Hyperion from Marvel Wikia
 Hyperion of Earth-712 at Marvel Wiki
 Hyperion (Squadron Sinister version) at Marvel Wiki
 King Hyperion at Marvel Wiki
 Zombie Hyperion at Marvel Wiki
 Hyperion of Earth-13034 at Marvel Wiki
 Hyperion (Squadron Supreme of America version) at Marvel Wiki

Avengers (comics) characters
Characters created by John Buscema
Characters created by Roy Thomas
Comics characters introduced in 1969
Comics characters introduced in 1971
Eternals (comics)
Fictional characters with superhuman durability or invulnerability
Marvel Comics characters who can move at superhuman speeds
Marvel Comics characters with accelerated healing
Marvel Comics characters with superhuman senses
Marvel Comics characters with superhuman strength
Marvel Comics extraterrestrial superheroes
Marvel Comics superheroes
Squadron Supreme